Nathan Hardy Andrews (September 30, 1913 – April 26, 1991) was a pitcher in Major League Baseball who played for the St. Louis Cardinals (1937, 1939), Cleveland Indians (1940–41), Boston Braves (1943–45), Cincinnati Reds (1946) and New York Giants (1946). Andrews batted and threw right-handed. He was born in Robeson County, North Carolina.

Andrews played college baseball at the University of North Carolina and pitched for five Major League teams in a span of eight seasons. After he led the National League with 20 losses in 1943, he won a career-high 16 games in 1944 and was also selected for the All-Star Game. In his career, he posted a 41–54 record with 216 strikeouts and a 3.46 earned run average in 773 innings pitched, including five shutouts and 50 complete games.

On April 26, 1991, Andrews died in Winston-Salem, North Carolina, at age 77.

References

External links

Nate Andrews - Baseballbiography.com

1913 births
1991 deaths
People from Pembroke, North Carolina
Major League Baseball pitchers
Baseball players from North Carolina
St. Louis Cardinals players
Cleveland Indians players
Boston Braves players
Cincinnati Reds players
New York Giants (NL) players
National League All-Stars
Minor league baseball managers
Florence Steelers players